= Egyptian Futsal League =

Futsal league in Egypt

- Country: Egypt
- Confederation: CAF
- Level on pyramid: 1
- Domestic cup: Egyptian Cup
- Current champions: Misr Lel Makkasa SC (2019)
- Most championships: Misr Lel Makkasa SC (? titles)
- Website: Official website
- Current: 2018–19

Egyptian Futsal Championship (Arabic: بطولة مصر لكرة الصالة) is the premier futsal league in Egypt. The competition is run by the Egyptian Futsal League under the auspices of the Egyptian Football Association.

== List of champions ==
?

- 2014–15: Misr Lel Makkasa SC
- 2015–16:
- 2016–17:
- 2017–18:
- 2018–19: Misr Lel Makkasa SC

== See also ==
- Egyptian Futsal Cup
